Duby is a surname. It may refer to:

Caroline Duby Glassman (1922–2013), U.S. attorney and jurist
Craig Duby (born 1949), Australian politician
Georges Duby (1919–1996), French historian
Heather Duby (born 1974), U.S. singer/songwriter
Jacques Duby (1922–2012), French actor
Jean Étienne Duby (1798–1885), Swiss clergyman and botanist,
Virginie Duby-Muller (born 1979), French politician

French-language surnames